The Flat Rock Tunnel is an active railroad tunnel located on Norfolk Southern's Harrisburg Line near Manayunk, Pennsylvania, United States.  The tunnel was built by the Reading Railroad for its line along the Schuylkill River.

Construction of the tunnel started in 1836 and it opened in 1840. In 1858-9 the Flat Rock and Black Rock Tunnels were widened to accommodate the wider rolling stock from the Lebanon Valley Branch. The widening of the tunnel was the first project to employ electric detonation of multiple explosive charges.

See also
 List of tunnels documented by the Historic American Engineering Record in Pennsylvania

References

External links

Transportation buildings and structures in Montgomery County, Pennsylvania
Lower Merion Township, Pennsylvania
Norfolk Southern Railway tunnels
Railroad tunnels in Pennsylvania
Reading Railroad tunnels
Historic American Engineering Record in Pennsylvania